Mark, Don & Terry 1966–67 is a November 1972 2-LP set compilation album by the American garage rock band Terry Knight and the Pack released on ABKCO Records in an effort to cash in on the March 1972 Capitol Records double album Mark, Don & Mel: 1969–71 by Grand Funk Railroad. The album has a plain blue cover with green lettering similar to that of the plain black cover with red lettering of the earlier Grand Funk Railroad release. Mark Farner and Don Brewer from Grand Funk had been in Terry Knight and The Pack with Terry Knight, who then managed them until 1972. Knight also managed the Ft. Worth Texas group Bloodrock until mid 1971.

Track listing
 All songs written by Terry Knight, except where noted.
 (I Can't Get No) Satisfaction - (Jagger/Richards)  
 Dimestore Debutante
 The Shut In 
 I've Been Told 
 Numbers 
 Got Love 
 Lady Jane - (Jagger/Richards)
 Sleep Talking
 Love Goddess of Sunset Strip  
 Dirty Lady
 I (Who Have Nothing) - (Carlo Donida, Jerry Leiber, Mike Stoller, Mogol)
 Lizabeth Peach - (Anthony Paul Byrne)
 Forever and a Day  
 Bad Boy - (Gerry Goffin/Carole King) 
 Mister, You're a Better Man Than I - (Brian Hugg, Mike Hugg)
 Love, Love, Love, Love
 This Precious Time - (P. F. Sloan, Steve Barri)
 Lovin' Kind 
 Come With Me 
 A Change on the Way 
 One Monkey Don't Stop No Show - (Joe Tex)

References

http://www.markfarner.com/discography.php#35

1972 compilation albums
Terry Knight and the Pack albums
ABKCO Records compilation albums